Lepechinia ganderi is a rare species of perennial shrub in the mint family known by the common name San Diego pitcher sage or Gander's pitcher sage. An aromatic plant with white to lavender flowers, this species is only known from southern San Diego County in California and a small portion of Baja California, occurring on chaparral or coastal sage scrub in metavolcanic soils. Because of its limited range, it is under threat from growing urbanization and increased fire frequency.

Description

Lepechinia ganderi is a short, aromatic shrub with slender branches coated in rough hairs and resin glands. The leaves are lance-shaped (lanceolate) and may have toothed (serrate) edges. The raceme inflorescence bears flowers on pedicels that are 1 to 2 cm long. Each flower has a base of long, pointed sepals below a white to light lavender tubular corolla. The flower is lipped at the mouth. The small, dark, hairless fruit develops attached to the sepals once the corolla falls.

The flowers are pollinated by bees and hummingbirds.

Taxonomy 
The type specimen of this species was collected on Otay Mountain. Plants of this species have a chromosome count of n = 16. Phylogenetic analyses place this species in a well-supported clade with Lepechinia calycinia, and within a larger clade that mostly consists of Mexican and Central American taxa.

Distribution and habitat 
This species is a near-endemic to southern San Diego County, California and the neighboring border region of Baja California. It is known from around 20 occurrences in the United States, many on federal land. The Mexican populations are not well studied. It is distributed throughout the coastal Peninsular Range foothills and mountains in this area, including Otay Mountain and the Jamul Mountains.

Plants of this species are typically found growing on rocky, metavolcanic, gabbroic substrates, often in habitats ranging from coastal sage scrub and chaparral to closed-cone coniferous forest, such as Tecate cypress groves, and grasslands, at elevations from 500 to 1060 meters.

See also
California chaparral and woodlands
California coastal sage and chaparral
California montane chaparral and woodlands
Clinopodium chandleri – Another rare plant species in the mint family that occupies a similar nearby habitat
Lepechinia cardiophylla – Similar, but with broader calyx lobes and a mildly cordate leaf base

References

External links
Jepson Manual Treatment
USDA Plants Profile
Sierra Club Profile c. 1994
BLM Profile
Photo gallery

ganderi
Flora of California
Flora of Baja California
Natural history of the California chaparral and woodlands
Natural history of the Peninsular Ranges
Natural history of San Diego County, California